Simone Ferrari may refer to:

 Simone Ferrari (footballer) (born 1999), Italian football player
 Simone Ferrari (rugby union) (born 1994), Italian rugby union player